John Stanley is an Australian radio broadcaster, who  was the co-host with Paul B. Kidd of the breakfast show on Sydney radio station 2GB, a station he worked at since the 1990s.

In 2014, Stanley received the title of "Radio commentator of the year" at the Kennedy Awards for Excellence in NSW Journalism.

References

Living people
Year of birth missing (living people)
2GB presenters